Michael Alexander Petrasso (born 9 July 1995) is a Canadian professional soccer player as a winger and currently plays for York United.

Early life
Petrasso was born in Toronto, and grew up in Woodbridge, just north of Toronto. He started playing youth football at the age of three for local junior club Kleinburg Nobleton SC. He joined TFC Academy, the youth setup of Major League Soccer side Toronto FC at the age of fifteen. His younger brother Luca plays for Toronto FC.

Club career

Toronto FC
Petrasso began his career at Canadian club Toronto FC, where he played at youth level as a part of the TFC Academy. In 2012, he departed from the club, along with teammates Keven Alemán and Dylan Carreiro, after falling out of favour with the academy, while under manager Aron Winter. Petrasso and Carreiro trained with Canadian Soccer League club SC Toronto after their exit from Toronto FC, shortly before both moving to English Premier League side Queens Park Rangers.

Queens Park Rangers
In his first season at QPR, Petrasso was an integral member of the squad that won the Professional Development League 2 at under-18 level, while also making several appearances for the under-21 side in the same season.

After continuing his good form into the 2013–14 season with the under-21 squad, Petrasso was rewarded with a loan move to League One side Oldham Athletic on 22 November 2013. He made his senior début the following day in a league match against Gillingham, in which he started the match and scored the sole goal of the game. Petrasso's two – month loan with Oldham Athletic ended on 18 January 2014, returning to Loftus Road after some excellent performances, appearing 15 times and scoring one goal which was on his debut for the club.

On 14 February 2014, Petrasso joined League One side Coventry City on an initial 28-day loan. He scored his first goal for the club in a 3–1 defeat to Tranmere Rovers. On 13 March 2014, Petrasso extended his loan stay with the Sky Blues until 16 March 2014 to cover the match scheduled against Port Vale, with a view to extending the loan further until the end of the 2013–14 season. At the end of his loan spell, Petrasso had made 7 appearances scoring 1 goal.

On 7 April 2014, Petrasso signed a new three-year contract with QPR. He made his Queens Park Rangers first team debut on 3 May 2014, in a 3–2 final game of the season win against Barnsley replacing Yossi Benayoun as a substitute in the 76th minute.

After failing to make QPR's 25-man squad in the Premier League for the 2014–15 season, Petrasso was loaned out to gain further experience at Leyton Orient on 11 September 2014 on a one-month loan, until 7 October 2014. Petrasso made his debut on 13 September 2014 in a 2–0 defeat at home to Colchester United in which he started, but was however later substituted in the 69th minute by Jobi McAnuff.

Petrasso moved to Notts County on a 93-day emergency day loan on 14 October 2014. He made his debut on 18 October, replacing Zeli Ismail in the 74th minute in a 5–3 victory over Crawley Town. He scored his first goals for Notts County in a 3–2 victory over Barnsley on 21 October.

Since then, Petrasso has continued to show excellent form, scoring his third goal in just five appearances since joining Notts County, as his side fell 2–1 to Yeovil Town in League One on Saturday, 22 November 2014.

Petrasso stayed at Loftus Road going into the 2015–2016 season. He made his full debut with the side on 28 November 2015, starting against Leeds United.

Petrasso picked up a long-term injury in the pre-season of the 2016–2017 season and after 9 months out injured Petrasso made his return to the Rangers first team by replacing Darnell Furlong in a 1–0 defeat away to Aston Villa.

On 12 January 2018, Petrasso left QPR alongside teammate Reece Grego-Cox.

Montreal Impact
On 18 January 2018, Petrasso joined Montreal Impact in MLS. Petrasso made his Impact debut against Vancouver Whitecaps FC during the 2018 season opener.

Valour FC
On 18 March 2019, Petrasso signed with Canadian Premier League side Valour FC. He made his debut for Valour in their inaugural game on May 1 against Pacific FC. Petrasso scored his first goal for the club in their next game on May 5 against FC Edmonton.

York United
On 24 January 2020, Petrasso signed with York9 (later renamed York United). He made his debut for York on August 18 against Pacific FC. Despite missing significant time during the Island Games tournament, Petrasso would sign a 2-year extension with York9, keeping him with the club through the 2022 season.

Barnet (loan)
He joined Barnet, in the National League in the English fifth-tier, on a season-long loan on 5 October 2020. He scored twice on his debut in a 3–2 win away at Leiston in the FA Cup on 24 October. He suffered an injury in November causing him to miss a couple of months of action. He finished his loan on 28 May 2021, scoring ten goals in 31 games.

International career
Petrasso began his involvement with the Canada national team in 2010, as a member of training camps for both the under-15s and the under-17s. He was named as a member of the under-17 squad to play in the 2011 CONCACAF U-17 Championship, and scored a hat-trick in an 8–0 win against Barbados in the group stage. He has also represented Canada at the U-20 level and was a part of the team that went to the 2013 CONCACAF U-20 Championship.

In October 2013, Petrasso had his first experience with Canada's senior team, when he was announced as a member of the senior squad's training camp, ahead of the friendly against Australia. However, he did not see time in the match. In November 2014 Petrasso returned to the U-20s for a series of friendlies. He scored a goal during the first friendly against England in a 2–2 draw. In December 2014, Petrasso was named the Canada Soccer U20 Player of the Year.

Petrasso was named to the 35-man provisional squad for the 2015 CONCACAF Gold Cup by Canada coach Benito Floro on 10 June 2015. On 27 August 2015, Petrasso received a call-up to the Canada senior squad for their two-legged World Cup qualifier against Belize. He made his debut for the senior side in a friendly against Azerbaijan on 3 June 2016. He started the match and played the first 61 minutes of the eventual 1–1 draw.

After appearing for new Canada coach Octavio Zambrano in the Qatar-hosted Aspire tournament with the U23 side in March 2017, Petrasso was named to the 40-man provisional team for the 2017 CONCACAF Gold Cup on 6 June 2017. On 27 June, he was named to the final 23-man squad.

Personal
He is the older brother of Toronto FC player Luca Petrasso.

Career statistics

Club

International

References

External links
 
 
 

Living people
1995 births
Association football midfielders
Canadian soccer players
Soccer players from Toronto
People from Vaughan
Canadian people of Sicilian descent
Canadian people of Italian descent
Canadian expatriate soccer players
Expatriate footballers in England
Canadian expatriate sportspeople in England
Toronto FC players
Queens Park Rangers F.C. players
Oldham Athletic A.F.C. players
Coventry City F.C. players
Leyton Orient F.C. players
Notts County F.C. players
CF Montréal players
Valour FC players
York United FC players
Barnet F.C. players
Canadian Soccer League (1998–present) players
English Football League players
Major League Soccer players
Canadian Premier League players
Canada men's youth international soccer players
Canada men's under-23 international soccer players
Canada men's international soccer players
2015 CONCACAF U-20 Championship players
2017 CONCACAF Gold Cup players